is a feminine Japanese given name.

Possible writings
Nanako can be written using different kanji characters and can mean:
奈々子, "Nara, repeat previous kanji, child"
菜々子, "greens, repeat previous kanji, child"
奈那子, "apple tree, unknown, child"
The name can also be written in hiragana or katakana.

People
, Japanese racewalker
Nanako Matsushima (菜々子, born 1973), Japanese actress
, Japanese actress
, Japanese Professor Emeritus 
, Japanese professional footballer
Nanako Takushi (奈々子, born 1976), Japanese J-pop singer
, Japanese basketball player
Nanako Inoue (井上 奈々子, born 1983), Japanese voice actress
, Japanese shogi player

Fictional characters

Given name 
Nanako Dojima, a character in the video game Persona 4
Nanako Hasaba, a character from Jujutsu Kaisen 
Nanako Hasegawa, a character in the manga and live-action series Haruka 17
Nanako Itagaki, a character in the manga and anime series Fighting Spirit
Nanako Kanazawa, a character in the manga and anime series Mahoraba
Nanako Kashii, a character in the manga and anime series Toradora!
Nanako Kuroi, a teacher character in Lucky Star
Nanako Meino, a minor recurring character in the anime and manga series 'The Prince of Tennis
Nanako Misonoo, the main character of the manga and anime series Oniisama e...
Nanako Mizuki, a character in the manga, anime, and live-action series Great Teacher Onizuka
Nanako Momoi, a character in the manga Your and My Secret
Nanako Oohara, a character in the manga and anime series Crayon Shin-chan
Nanako Shichigusa, the titular character in the anime OVA series, Amazing Nurse Nanako
Nanako Saeki, a character in the manga and anime series The Flowers of Evil
Nanako Yukishiro (written 七々子, with the kanji for seven), the main character of the manga and anime series Senryu Girl

Surname 
Maaya Nanako (魚々戸), a character in the manga and anime series Kenkō Zenrakei Suieibu Umishō

See also
Amazing Nurse Nanako, an anime OVA series
nanaco, a prepaid and rechargeable contactless electronic money card
Nanako SOS, a manga and anime series

Japanese feminine given names